Rosedale, a historic property comprising the Graves Mill ruins, Christopher Johnson Cottage, and Rosedale mansion, is  located at Lynchburg, Virginia.  The Rosedale property contains two buildings of major importance, the ruins of an 18th-century grist mill, and numerous subsidiary buildings.  The earliest structure remaining is the Christopher Johnson Cottage, dating from ca. 1764 to 1774. The small, -story frame structure has long been known as the Johnson Cottage.  The Rosedale mansion was erected in 1836 by Odin Clay, the first president of the Virginia and Tennessee Railroad, and is a two-story, three-bay, brick home laid in Flemish bond.  The house was enlarged in 1929; a three-bay brick wing was added the original house.  It was designed by Lynchburg architect Stanhope S. Johnson, who is best known for designing the Allied Arts Building.

It was listed on the National Register of Historic Places in 1983, with a boundary increase in 1992.

References

External links
Rosedale, Old Graves Mill Road, Lynchburg, VA: 3 photos, 1 data page, and 1 photo caption page, at Historic American Buildings Survey
Christopher Johnson Cottage, State Route 126, Lynchburg vicinity, Campbell County, VA: 3 drawings, 3 photos, 4 data pages, and 2 photo caption pages, at Historic American Buildings Survey

Houses completed in 1774
Historic American Buildings Survey in Virginia
Houses on the National Register of Historic Places in Virginia
Greek Revival houses in Virginia
Houses in Lynchburg, Virginia
National Register of Historic Places in Lynchburg, Virginia
1764 establishments in Virginia